Mackellar is the surname of:
 Dorothea Mackellar, influential bush poet
 Duncan Mackellar and his identically named nephew, Duncan Mackellar, Junior, both early colonial settlers of the area near Braidwood.
 Michael MacKellar, former Member for Warringah
 Patrick MacKellar, British military engineer, 1717-1778

In addition, Mackellar may refer to:
 The Division of Mackellar, an Australian Federal electorate first held by William Wentworth IV
 Mackellar Girls Campus, a girls' high school in Manly Vale, a suburb of Sydney

See also
 McKellar (disambiguation)